Ravi Kishan Shukla (born 17 July 1969), popularly known as Ravi Kishan, is an Indian actor, politician, film producer and television personality. He currently serves as Member of parliament, Lok Sabha from Gorakhpur. His film works are predominantly in Bhojpuri and Hindi cinema, as well as Telugu cinema. He has also appeared in a few Kannada and Tamil films.

In 2006, he participated in Bigg Boss, the Indian version of Big Brother. He ended up as the second runner up. He was also a contestant on Jhalak Dikhhla Jaa 5 in 2012.

Personal life
Ravi Kishan was born on 17 July 1969 in Bombay, Maharashtra, India. He is the youngest of five siblings. He studied up to 12th at Rizvi College Bandra West, Mumbai. His family hails from Kerakat, Jaunpur district, Uttar Pradesh, where Kishan lived for about seven years.

Ravi Kishan married Priti Shukla on 10 December 1993, and they have four children, one son and three daughters. His daughter Riva Kishan made her film debut with Sab Kushal Mangal in 2020.

Career

Acting
In June 2008, Kishan was awarded the Most Popular Actor award at the ETV Bhojpuri Cinema Samman 2008 function. Popular reality shows such as Bigg Boss, and more recently Ek Se Badhkar Ek – Jalwe Sitaron Ke have brought him to the front line of top Indian television actors. In 2008, he started co-hosting the celebrity dance-based reality show Bathroom Singer, Naman:Ek Sansani and Ek Se Badhkar Ek – Jalwe Sitaron Ke on Zee. Kishan also hosted the reality show Raaz Pichhle Janam Ka, on NDTV Imagine for two seasons. He worked with film directors Shyam Benegal and Mani Ratnam in 2010.

A film starring Kishan, Jala Debh Duniya Tohra Pyar Mein, produced by the American film company PUN Films, was shown in the India Pavilion at the Cannes Film Festival 2010., In 2011 he had a role in the film Shraddha In The Name Of God directed by Gurubhai Thakkar.

In 2013, Kishan was one of the judges on the reality TV show Sales Ka Bazigar, telecast on ETV. The show aimed to find the best salesperson in Uttar Pradesh and Uttarakhand. The top ten people who made it to the finales were to be employed by the presenter of the show Su-kam Power Systems. The winner would get a package of ten lakhs per annum, followed by the first runner-up winning a package of six lakhs per annum. This show was the first of its kind to find the best salesperson in India, and saw participation from over 10,000 people from regions across Uttar Pradesh and Uttarakhand.

Kishan made his South Indian debut with the 2014 Telugu film Race Gurram. In 2017 he made his Kannada debut in Hebbuli and Tamil debut with Monisha En Monalisa in 1999. In 2018, he had a role in the film MLA.

Politics
Kishan joined Indian National Congress (INC) from Jaunpur constituency in Uttar Pradesh, and contested in the 2014 general elections where he secured only 42,759 votes or 4.25 per cent of the total votes and finished 6th. In February 2017, Kishan left the Congress Party and joined the BJP.

Ravi Kishan was named for Gorakhpur during 2019 General election by Bharatiya Janata Party . He contested the 2019 general elections against Samajwadi party candidate Rambhual Nishad in Gorakhpur constituency of Uttar Pradesh. Kishan, won against Rambhual Nishad by a lead of over 3,01,664 votes. Ravi Kishan polled 7,17,122 votes, while Rambhual Nishad polled 4,15,458 votes.

Dubbing
In 2008, Kishan dubbed Tobey Maguire's role as Spider-Man in Spider-Man 3 into Bhojpuri. This is the first Hollywood blockbuster film to include a Bhojpuri voice dub, along with Hindi, Tamil, and Telugu dubs.

Filmography

Films

Dubbing roles

Television

Web series

References

External links

 
 
 

1969 births
Living people
21st-century Indian male actors
Indian male voice actors
Male actors in Hindi cinema
Male actors in Bhojpuri cinema
Male actors in Telugu cinema
Indian male film actors
Indian male television actors
People from Jaunpur, Uttar Pradesh
Indian male actors
India MPs 2019–present
Bharatiya Janata Party politicians from Uttar Pradesh
Indian National Congress politicians from Uttar Pradesh
Indian actor-politicians
Bigg Boss (Hindi TV series) contestants
National Democratic Alliance candidates in the 2019 Indian general election